Sverre Isachsen (born 11 November 1970) is a Norwegian rallycross driver.

Career
Isachsen started with motorsports in 1989, and became Norwegian Rallycross Champion in 1999 and 2000. In 2009, 2010 and 2011 he became the European Rallycross Champion with a Ford Focus. He was also awarded the "Driver of the Year" title by the Norwegian Autosport Federation in 2010 and 2011.

In 2012, Isachen signed a three-year deal to drive the Global RallyCross Championship for Subaru Puma Rallycross Team, together with Dave Mirra and Bucky Lasek. He previously drove the 2016 Subaru WRX STI GRC Car for Subaru. After the 2016 season, he and his teammate Bucky Lasek left Subaru to pursuit in other areas. Both of the drivers' replacements are Chris Atkinson and Patrick Sandell. His exploits in the Global RallyCross Championship have earned him the nickname of “The Viking Warrior” in the U.S.

Isachen lives in Hokksund, Norway.

Racing record

Complete FIA European Rallycross Championship results

Division 1

Supercar

Complete FIA World Rallycross Championship results

Supercar

Complete Global RallyCross Championship results

Supercar

Race cancelled.

References

External links

1970 births
Living people
Norwegian racing drivers
European Rallycross Championship drivers
World Rallycross Championship drivers
Global RallyCross Championship drivers